Shwe Sai, is a retired Burmese Lethwei fighter and former Openweight Lethwei World Champion.

Personal life
Shwe Sai is born in the Karen state and has a son named Sai Maung Maung, who also competes in Lethwei and who is signed to the World Lethwei Championship.

Lethwei career
On 10 and 11 July 2004, Shwe Sai and teammates Aye Bo Sein, Naing Wan Lay and Win Tun competed in a Lethwei tournament at Thuwunna National Indoor Stadium in Yangon, Myanmar. The Burmese fighters were matched against four Japanese fighters: Tamura, Yoshitaro Niimi, Takaharu Yamamoto and Seiji Wakasugi.

During his reign, Shwe Sai faced Zaw Win Tun, 1996 Golden Belt Champion, with Shwe Sai having the upper hand having won one fight while the other was a draw. On 2 August 2019, Shwe Sai's son Sai Maung Maung, was supposed to continue the rivalry and face the son of his past rival Saw Win Tun at WLC 9: King of Nine Limbs, but the fight was cancelled due to medical reason.

In 2006, Shwe Sai was stripped of the Openweight Lethwei World title for failure to defend the title. Former Openweight champion Shwe War Tun was selected to faced number one contender Lone Chaw and crown a new champion. Lone Chaw was victorious and became the new Openweight Champion. On 4 May, 2009, as reposted by MMA Mania, Shwe Sai and Lone Chaw eventually faced each other in Yangon. Shwe Sai knocked out Lone Chaw in a spectacular manner.

Championships and accomplishments

Championships 
Lethwei World Champion
 Openweight Lethwei Golden Belt

Lethwei record 

|- style="background:#c5d2ea;"
| 2019-11-25 || Draw || align="left" | Saw Nga Man || Myanmar vs. Thailand Challenge Fights, Myaing Gyi Ngu || Hpa-an, Myanmar || Draw || 2 || 3:00
|- style="background:#c5d2ea;"
| 2011 || Draw || align="left" | Phoe Kay || Challenge Fight  || Myanmar || Draw || 5 || 3:00
|- style="background:#c5d2ea;"
| 2010-01-10 || Draw || align="left" | Yan Gyi Aung || Win Sein Taw Ya 2010 || Mudon Township, Myanmar || Draw || 5 || 3:00
|- style="background:#fbb;"
| 2009-04-05 || Loss || align="left" | Lone Chaw || Dagon Shwe Aung Lan Final || Yangon, Myanmar || KO || 5 || 0:18
|-
! style=background:white colspan=9 | 
|- style="background:#fbb;"
| 2009-02-28 || Loss || align="left" | Yan Gyi Aung || Dagon Shwe Aung Lan Semi-final || Yangon, Myanmar || Decision || 5 ||
|- style="background:#c5d2ea;"
| 2008-04-27 || Draw || align="left" | Yan Gyi Aung || Challenge Fights, Aung San National Indoor Stadium || Yangon, Myanmar || Draw || 5 || 3:00
|- style="background:#c5d2ea;"
| 2005-10-16 || Draw || align="left" | Lone Chaw || 2nd City F.M Aung Lan Tournament, M.C.C. || Yangon, Myanmar || Draw || 5 || 3:00
|- style="background:#c5d2ea;"
| 2004-07-11 || Draw || align="left" | Yoshitaro Niimi || Myanmar vs. Japan Challenge Fights || Yangon, Myanmar || Draw || 5 || 3:00
|- style="background:#cfc;"
| 2004-06-13 || Win ||align=left| Wan Chai || Challenge Fights, Thuwunna Gymnasium || Yangon, Myanmar || TKO || 3 || 2:52
|- style="background:#cfc;"
| 2004 || Win ||align=left| Shan Lay Thway || Challenge Fight 2004 || Yangon, Myanmar ||  ||  ||
|- style="background:#c5d2ea;"
| 1999-08-01 || Draw || align="left" | Ali || Ba Htoo football field || Mandalay, Myanmar || Draw || 5 || 3:00
|-
! style=background:white colspan=9 | 
|-
| colspan=9 | Legend:

References

External links

Living people
Year of birth missing (living people)
Burmese people of Karen descent
Burmese Lethwei practitioners
People from Kayin State